Aloeides margaretae, the Marguarite's copper, is a butterfly of the family Lycaenidae. It is found in South Africa, where it is known from the western coast and along the south coast in the Western Cape.

The wingspan is 25–30 mm for males and 26–33 mm females. Adults are on wing from September to May in several generations per year.

The larvae feed on Aspalathus spinosa species. The larvae hide under stones near the stem of their food plant. They are attended by ants.

References

Butterflies described in 1968
Aloeides
Endemic butterflies of South Africa